Claudin-15 is a protein that in humans is encoded by the CLDN15 gene. It belongs to the group of claudins. Among its related pathways are Blood-Brain Barrier and Immune Cell Transmigration: VCAM-1/CD106 Signaling Pathways and Tight junction. GO annotations related to this gene include identical protein binding and structural molecule activity. An important paralog of this gene is CLDN10.

References

External links

Further reading